Jeffrey Williams Ubben (born 1961/1962) is an American businessman. He is the co-founder and chairman of ValueAct Capital, a hedge fund based in San Francisco, California. Ubben is an activist board member of Exxon Mobil.

Early life 
Jeffrey W. Ubben graduated from Duke University. He received a master of business administration from the Kellogg School of Management at Northwestern University in 1987.

Business career
Ubben managed the Fidelity Value Fund at Fidelity Investments for eight years. He served as the Managing Partner of Blum Capital from 1995 to 2000.

Ubben is the co-founder of ValueAct Capital, a hedge fund based in San Francisco, California, in 2000.

Ubben formerly served on the Boards of Directors of Acxiom, Gartner, Misys, Omnicare, and the Sara Lee Corporation. He serves on the board of directors of the Willis Group. In September 2015, he was nominated to serve on the Board of Directors of 21st Century Fox.

In August 2015, Ubben acquired a minority stake in the United Talent Agency.

In June 2020, Ubben left ValueAct Capital in order to focus on social investing.

Philanthropy
Ubben is chair emeritus of the national Board of Directors of the Posse Foundation. He serves on the Boards of Trustees of Northwestern University and the American Conservatory Theater. Ubben is also on the board of directors of the E.O. Wilson Biodiversity Foundation. In September, 2019, it was announced that Jeff Ubben and his wife Laurie "have made an estate commitment of $50 million to support scholarships for undergraduate, graduate and professional school students" at Northwestern University, the largest donation towards financial aid in the university's history.

References

1962 births
Living people
Duke University alumni
Kellogg School of Management alumni
American company founders
American chief executives
American hedge fund managers
American corporate directors
Chief investment officers
Directors of ExxonMobil